The Sbârcioara is a left tributary of the river Turcu in Romania. It flows into the Turcu in Moieciu de Jos.

References

Rivers of Romania
Rivers of Brașov County